Indium-111 (111In) is a radioactive isotope of indium (In). It decays by electron capture to stable cadmium-111 with a half-life of 2.8 days.
Indium-111 chloride (111InCl) solution is produced by proton irradiation of a cadmium target (112Cd(p,2n) or 111Cd(p,n)) in a cyclotron, as recommended by International Atomic Energy Agency (IAEA). The former method is more commonly used as it results in a high level of radionuclide purity.

Indium-111 is commonly used in nuclear medicine diagnostic imaging by radiolabeling targeted molecules or cells. During its radioactive decay, it emits low energy gamma (γ) photons which can be imaged using planar or single-photon emission computed tomography (SPECT) gamma cameras (primary energies (ε) of 171.3 keV (91%) and 245.4 keV (94%))

Uses in nuclear medicine

When formulated as an 111InCl solution, it can be used to bind antibodies, peptides, or other molecular targeted proteins or other molecules, typically using a chelate to bind the radionuclide (in this case 111In) to the targeting molecule during the radiosynthesis/ radiolabeling process, which is tailored to the desired product.

111In labeled antibodies

 Ibritumomab Tiuxetan; Zevalin - For dosimetry estimates prior to 90Y immunotherapy for lymphoma
 111In ProstaScint — PSMA antibody imaging of prostate cancer

111In labeled peptides

 111In pentetreotide (including in 111In (diethylenetriaminopentaacetic (DTPA)-octreotide) and Octreoscan)
 Octreotide is an somatostatin receptor inhibitor pharmaceutical which binds with high affinity to somatostatin receptors 2 and 5, interfering with normal receptor function. It is used as a drug to treat several neuroendocrine tumors in which somatostatin receptors are overexpressed or overactive. Examples include: 
 Sympathoadrenal system tumors: pheochromocytoma, neuroblastoma, ganglioneuroma, paraganglioma
 Gastroenteropancreatic (GEP) tumors: carcinoid, insulinoma
 Medullary thyroid cancer, pituitary adenoma, small cell lung cancer
 111In pentetreotide imaging can identify the presence, levels of somatostatin receptor 2,5 expression, extent of disease and response to therapy

111In can also be formulated in the chemical form 111In oxyquinoline (oxine) for labeling blood cells and components

Platelets for thrombus detection
Leukocytes for localization of inflammation and abscesses, detect and monitor osteomyelitis, and detect mycotic aneurysms, vascular graft and shunt infections and determination of leukocyte kinetics;

See also
 Isotopes of indium
 Indium white blood cell scan

References

Indium-111
Medical isotopes